OctopuSocial is a web application for managing, scheduling and analyzing of social networking oriented to small, medium and large businesses looking to track their brands and/or products. It is presented as an alternative for managing social media. Its main feature is the multi-run connecting with networks like Facebook, Twitter and Instagram. Compared to other applications, it is distinguished by the ability to manage accounts in the style of Instagram, in columnar format, allowing comments and likes.

History 
Developed as the first tool of its kind in Venezuela, the first version was published in 2011 and known as autotuits.com. It was defined as a system for publishing content on Twitter. In April 2014, it became OctopuSocial.com, evolving as a social media platform for programming, management, and analysis for Facebook, Twitter and Instagram, including integration with services like Bit.ly, Klout and RSS.

In July 2014, it was named as the first social media manager for Latin America by Colombiadigital.net and since then its presence in Latin America has been noted as an option for the management of social networks.

The project is located as the number No. 8 in Venezuela and # 2,587 in the world according to the application Startup Ranking.

References

External links 
 

Social media companies
Twitter services and applications